Beach Channel Drive is the main thoroughfare of the Rockaway Peninsula in the New York City borough of Queens. It extends from the Nassau County border at Inwood westward, to the Marine Parkway–Gil Hodges Memorial Bridge at the end of Jacob Riis Park. From Hammels westward, it follows Jamaica Bay on the northern side of the peninsula.

Beach Channel Drive was opened on November 27, 1927, as a relatively short road west of the current site of the Cross Bay Veterans Memorial Bridge. It was later expanded by consolidating a number of existing thoroughfares and constructing some linking roadways.

One of the roads that would become Beach Channel Drive was the launching point for the first transatlantic flight. On May 8, 1919, four United States Navy Navy-Curtis seaplanes took off in Neponsit and headed off to the British colony of Newfoundland, the Azores Islands, and Lisbon, Portugal. On May 31, one of the aircraft, piloted by Lieutenant Commander Albert C. Read, arrived in Plymouth, England.

Transportation
The Q22 serves Beach Channel Drive between Beach 73rd Street and Seagirt Boulevard. The northbound Q52+ Select Bus Service serves Beach Channel Drive between Beach 54th Street and Beach 59th Street. The QM17 express bus between Far Rockaway and Midtown runs along Beach Channel Drive for the same segment as the Q22. The IND Rockaway Line parallels Beach Channel Drive between both of its termini, Beach 116th Street and Mott Avenue.

References

Transportation in Rockaway, Queens
Streets in Queens, New York